James Howard Woods (born April 18, 1947) is an American actor. He is known for fast-talking intense roles on stage and screen. He received various accolades including three Emmy Awards, a Golden Globe Award, three Screen Actors Guild Awards as well as nominations for two Academy Awards. He started his career in minor roles on and off-Broadway. In 1972, he appeared in The Trial of the Catonsville Nine alongside Sam Waterston on Broadway. In 1978, he made his television breakthrough alongside Meryl Streep, playing her husband in the acclaimed NBC miniseries Holocaust, which received the Primetime Emmy Award for Outstanding Limited Series. 

Woods early film roles include in The Visitors (1972), The Way We Were (1973) and Night Moves (1975). He rose to prominence portraying Gregory Powell in The Onion Field (1979). He earned two Academy Awards nominations: one for Best Actor for Salvador (1986) and for Best Supporting Actor for Ghosts of Mississippi (1996).  His career spans five decades and includes collaborations with some of the most acclaimed filmmakers of his time, such as John Carpenter, Elia Kazan, Martin Scorsese, David Cronenberg, Sergio Leone, Clint Eastwood, Sydney Pollack, Arthur Penn, Oliver Stone, Rob Reiner, Richard Attenborough, and Sofia Coppola. Notable film roles include in Videodrome (1983), Once Upon a Time in America (1984), Nixon (1995), Chaplin (1992), Casino (1995), Contact (1997), Vampires (1998), Any Given Sunday (1999), and The Virgin Suicides (1999). 

He is the recipient of two Primetime Emmy Awards for Outstanding Lead Actor in a Limited Series or Movie for his roles as D.J. in the CBS movie Promise (1987) and Bill W. in the ABC film My Name Is Bill W. (1989). He has also portrayed Roy Cohn in Citizen Cohn (1992) and Dick Fuld in Too Big to Fail (2011). He starred in CBS legal series Shark (2006-2008), and had a recurring role in the Showtime crime series Ray Donovan (2013). He is also known for his voice roles in the animated features Hercules (1997), Recess: School's Out (2001), Stuart Little 2 (2002), and Surf's Up (2007) and for voice-acting as himself on various episodes of Family Guy and The Simpsons.

Early life 
Woods was born on April 18, 1947, in Vernal, Utah, and had a brother ten years younger. His father, Gail Peyton Woods, was an army intelligence officer who died in 1960 after routine surgery. His mother, Martha A., ran a pre-school after her husband's death and later married Thomas E. Dixon. Woods grew up in Warwick, Rhode Island, where he attended Pilgrim High School, from which he graduated in 1965. He is of part Irish descent and was raised Catholic, briefly serving as an altar boy.

Woods was an undergraduate at Massachusetts Institute of Technology. He stated on Inside the Actors Studio that he originally intended to become an eye surgeon. He pledged the Theta Delta Chi fraternity and was a member of the student theatre group Dramashop, acting in and directing a number of plays. He dropped out of MIT in 1969, one semester before graduating, to pursue an acting career. 

Woods has said that he owes his acting career to Tim Affleck, father of actors Ben and Casey Affleck, who was a stage manager at the Theatre Company of Boston, which Woods attended as a student.

Career

1970s
Woods appeared in 36 plays before making his Broadway debut in 1970 at the Lyceum Theatre, in the first American production of Frank McMahon’s adaptation of Brendan Behan's Borstal Boy. He got the part by pretending he was British. He returned to Broadway the following year to portray David Darst in Daniel Berrigan's The Trial of the Catonsville Nine also at the Lyceum Theatre. In 1971, he played Bob Rettie in the American premiere of Michael Weller's Moonchildren at the Arena Stage in Washington, D.C. The following year the production moved to Broadway at the Royale Theatre where Woods starred alongside Edward Herrmann, and Christopher Guest. In 1972, Woods won a Theatre World Award for his performance. He returned to Broadway in 1973 to portray Steven Cooper in the original production of Jean Kerr's Finishing Touches at the Plymouth Theatre.

Woods has garnered a reputation as a prominent Hollywood character actor, having appeared in over 130 films and television series. By the early 1970s, he was getting small movie roles including his feature film debut in Elia Kazan's The Visitors and a spot as Barbra Streisand's boyfriend in The Way We Were.

In 1978, Woods played the husband of Meryl Streep in the critically acclaimed four episode miniseries Holocaust. The series focuses the story of a Jewish family's struggle to survive Nazi Germany's campaign of genocide against the Jewish people. The series also starred Michael Moriarty and Rosemary Harris. Holocaust won the Outstanding Limited Series as well as seven other Primetime Emmy Awards.

In 1979, Woods starred in The Onion Field as murderer Gregory Powell. He received good reviews for his performance, and was nominated for Best Actor awards from the Golden Globes, the National Society of Film Critics, and the New York Film Critics Circle Association.

1980s

Woods played Maximillian "Max" Bercovicz, a Jewish gangster, in Sergio Leone's epic Once Upon a Time in America (1984) alongside Robert De Niro, Elizabeth McGovern, Joe Pesci and Danny Aiello. Woods considers his role in the film as one of his favorites.
The film premiered at the 1984 Cannes Film Festival and received a 15-minute standing ovation. Rotten Tomatoes reports an 86% approval rating with 51 reviews, the consensus reading, "Sergio Leone's epic crime drama is visually stunning, stylistically bold, and emotionally haunting, and filled with great performances from the likes of Robert De Niro and James Woods." That same year, he also starred in Against All Odds as a nightclub owner who hires an aging football star, played by Jeff Bridges, to find his missing girlfriend.

In Oliver Stone's drama Salvador (1986), Woods portrayed real-life journalist Richard Boyle as he chronicles events in El Salvador. Despite his criticism that ""Salvador" is long and disjointed and tries to tell too many stories," Roger Ebert wrote in the Chicago Sun-Times, "This is the sort of role Woods was born to play". He won the Independent Spirit Award for Best Actor. He also received his first Academy Award nomination for his performance.

In 1987, Woods won his first Primetime Emmy Award for his role as a disabled man in the made-for-television film Promise (1986). The film also starred James Garner, and Piper Laurie. In 1989, Woods won his second Primetime Emmy Award, for his role as the founder of Alcoholics Anonymous, Bill W. in the made for television drama film, My Name is Bill W. starring James Garner, and Gary Sinese.

In 1988 Wood portrayed a man struggling with cocaine addiction in The Boost. While the film received mixed reviews Woods' was praised for his performance with Roger Ebert declaring that it was "one of the most convincing and horrifying portraits of drug addiction I’ve ever seen". He also added: 

On October 28, 1989, Woods hosted Saturday Night Live with Don Henley as the musical guest. In 1989, Woods starred alongside Glenn Close in the family drama Immediate Family.

1990s
Woods was offered a leading role in Quentin Tarantino's directorial debut, the low-budget film Reservoir Dogs (1992), but his agent rejected the script without showing it to the actor. When Woods learned of this some time later, he fired his agents (CAA), replacing them with ICM.

Woods played a minor role of a hustler, Lester Diamond, in Martin Scorsese's Casino (1995), alongside Robert De Niro, Sharon Stone, and Joe Pesci. When Woods had heard that Scorsese was interested in working with him, he called Scorsese's office and left the following message: "Any time, any place, any part, any fee." The film was well received by critics, earning a Certified Fresh rating on Rotten Tomatoes with the consensus reading, "Impressive ambition and bravura performances from an outstanding cast help Casino pay off in spite of a familiar narrative that may strike some viewers as a safe bet for director Martin Scorsese." Also in 1995, he starred as H.R. Haldeman in Oliver Stone's Nixon, opposite Anthony Hopkins as Richard Nixon. Woods received a Screen Actors Guild Award nomination along with the rest of the cast for its ensemble work.

In Rob Reiner's film Ghosts of Mississippi (1996), Woods appeared alongside Alec Baldwin and Whoopi Goldberg. He portrayed Byron De La Beckwith, a white supremacist who assassinated civil rights leader Medgar Evers in 1963. The film was not a box-office success and received mixed reviews, earning a critics' review of 43% on Rotten Tomatoes. Some critics, however, praised Woods' performance. Janet Maslin, in her New York Times review, states, "Woods's performance as the hateful old reprobate Beckwith is the film's chief sign of life". The Los Angeles Times published an article titled "James Woods is So Good at Being Bad". In the articles it describes Woods having aggressively lobbied director Rob Reiner for the role, which Reiner originally intended for an actor in his 70s, like Paul Newman.
"Beckwith's Mississippi accent, which Woods perfected by watching tapes and working with an accent coach, helped him distance himself from the character. 'I imagined I was speaking a foreign language'." Woods earned a Golden Globe nomination as well as his second Oscar nomination for Best Supporting Actor. 

Woods would later voice Hades in the Disney Animated film, Hercules (1997), where he received critical praise. Critic Roger Ebert described Woods' performance as full of "diabolical glee" and compared his performance of "verbal inventiveness" to that of Robin Williams in Aladdin. Janet Maslin of The New York Times also praised Woods' performance remarking "Woods shows off the full verve of an edgy Scarfe villain". 
He reprised the role of Hades again in the television series of the same name, where he won a Daytime Emmy Award in 2000 for his work in season 2, and in the Kingdom Hearts video game series. Woods appeared in Sofia Coppola's directorial debut The Virgin Suicides (1999) alongside Kirsten Dunst, Josh Hartnett, and Kathleen Turner. The film premiered at the 1999 Cannes Film Festival to a largely positive critical reception.

2000s–present
During the 2000s, Woods lent his voice to various films, video games, and television shows including another Disney film, Recess: School's Out (2001) as Dr. Phillium Benedict, the twisted former headmaster who attempts to abolish summer vacation. Woods would also voice Falcon in Stuart Little 2 (2002). In 2007, Woods voiced the role of Reggie Belafonte, a short-tempered sea otter, in the Sony Pictures Animation film, Surf's Up. The character is a Don King-like promoter for the main character's rival. The film went on to receive an Academy Award nomination for Best Animated Feature losing to Pixar's Ratatouille. From 2005 to 2016, Woods has played a recurring role as himself in Seth MacFarlane's Family Guy. He has continued to voice Hades in the Kingdom Hearts video games. Since 2016, he has also voiced the role of Lex Luthor in three animated series, Justice League Action. 

From 2006 to 2008, Woods starred in the CBS legal drama series Shark. He played an infamous defense lawyer who, after growing disillusioned when his client commits a murder, becomes a successful prosecutor with the Los Angeles County District Attorney's office. 

In 2011, Woods appeared in HBO's Too Big to Fail with Paul Giamatti, William Hurt, Cynthia Nixon, Tony Shalhoub and Bill Pullman. Woods played Richard S. Fuld, Jr., Chairman and CEO of Lehman Brothers, for which he won critical praise. The TV Movie earned 11 Primetime Emmy Award nominations including for Woods for Best Outstanding Supporting Actor. Woods also earned a Screen Actors Guild Nomination for his performance.

In 2012, Woods appeared in the limited series Coma alongside Geena Davis, Richard Dreyfuss, and Ellen Burstyn. The series was produced by Ridley Scott, and Tony Scott and premiered on A&E. In 2013, Woods joined Showtime's critically acclaimed series Ray Donovan in a recurring role as Patrick "Sully" Sullivan also starring Liev Schrieber, and Jon Voight.

He also appeared as a fictional version of himself in the episode of The Simpsons entitled "Homer and Apu" and in eight episodes of Family Guy, which is set in Woods' home state of Rhode Island. He is also the namesake for James Woods High School in Family Guy. The high school's name was later changed to Adam West High School to reflect the death of Adam West, who was a character in the show. Woods has lent his voice to video games such as Grand Theft Auto: San Andreas.

Other appearances

In 2012, Woods attended an anniversary screening of a restored cut of Once Upon a Time in America (1984) at the 65th Cannes Film Festival. The screening was made possible by Martin Scorsese and his Film Foundation which digitally restored the film as well as included 40 additional minutes of footage. Woods, Robert De Niro, Jennifer Connelly, and Elizabeth McGovern attended the premiere and introduced the film.

In 2014, Woods joined Robert De Niro for an anniversary screening of Once Upon a Time in America (1984) at the 52nd New York Film Festival at Film Society at Lincoln Center. 

In 2017, Woods made a rare public appearance at the Writers Guild of America Awards to honor his friend Oliver Stone, with whom he had collaborated three times (Salvador, Nixon, and Any Given Sunday), who was receiving the lifetime achievement award. During the ceremony, Woods bantered with host Patton Oswalt.

Acting credits

Selected credits:

Awards and nominations

For his work in film, Woods has received two Academy Award nominations for his performances in Oliver Stone's Salvador (1987), and Rob Reiner's Ghosts of Mississippi (1996). Woods has also received many award nominations for his performances in television such as Primetime Emmy Award, and a Golden Globe Award for his performance in the made-for-television film Promise (1986), and won his second Primetime Emmy Award for his performance in My Name is Bill W. (1989). He also received three Screen Actors Guild Award nominations and three Independent Spirit Award nominations winning for Salvador.

 On October 15, 1998, Woods was inducted into the Hollywood Walk of Fame with a star at 7021 Hollywood Blvd.

Personal life 

In 1980, Woods married costume designer Kathryn Morrison-Pahoa. They divorced in 1983. In 1989, he married 26-year-old equestrian and boutique owner Sarah Owen, but they divorced four months later. In 1992, Woods dated Heather Graham, his co-star in the film Diggstown.

Woods was raised as Roman Catholic and considers himself a practicing follower of the religion.

During a press interview for Kingdom Hearts II, Woods said that he was an avid video game player. He is a dealer of antiques in Rhode Island. 

On December 14, 2015, while he was driving alone westbound through an ice storm on Interstate 70 in Glenwood Canyon, Colorado, a speeding driver lost control and crashed into five other cars. He suffered a minor concussion.

Poker

Woods is an avid poker player, playing in cash games and many tournaments. He played in the WPT's Hollywood Home Game series in 2004 for the American Stroke Association charity. , he has over 80 tournament successes to his credit, including seventh place at the 2015 World Series of Poker in the $3000 No Limit Shootout event and fifth place in the $1,500 Dealers Choice event at the 2018 WSOP, as well as a $12,000 poker win in 2022 at Bally's Las Vegas.

Legal issues 
In 1988, Woods sued actress Sean Young for $2 million, accusing her of stalking him after they appeared together in the film The Boost. Young later countered that Woods had overreacted when she had spurned his on-set advances. The suit was settled out of court in August 1989, including a payment of $227,000 to Young to cover her legal costs.

In 2006, Woods' younger brother Michael Jeffrey Woods died from cardiac arrest at the age of 49. Woods sued Kent Hospital in Warwick, Rhode Island, alleging negligence. The lawsuit was settled in 2009.

In July 2015, Woods sued an anonymous Twitter user known as Abe List, and ten other Twitter users, for $10 million over an allegedly libelous tweet accusing him of being a "cocaine addict". Woods unsuccessfully sought to obtain the name of the Twitter user; the Los Angeles Superior Court denied his motion for discovery in October 2015, holding that he could not "use legal process to pierce the anonymity of internet speakers unless [he] can make a prima facie case." However, in an unexpected later ruling, the user's Anti-SLAPP motion was denied and Woods was permitted to pursue his lawsuit against List, with the ten other defendants being dropped from the lawsuit. In October 2016, the defendant's appeal was dismissed; attorney Lisa Bloom, who represented the anonymous Twitter user, revealed that the user had suddenly died. The case was settled out of court soon afterwards, with Woods receiving a letter from Bloom saying that her client "regretted making the tweet and further regrets any harm caused to Mr. Woods' reputation by the tweet."

In 2017, shortly before the Abe List litigation was resolved, Portia Boulger sued Woods for misidentifying her as a Nazi in an allegedly libelous tweet. The tweet included a photo of a different woman giving a Nazi salute while wearing a Donald Trump t-shirt at a campaign event. Boulger sought $3 million in damages. The court ruled in favor of Woods under the innocent construction rule. Boulger appealed, but the United States Court of Appeals for the Sixth Circuit upheld the ruling.

Political views
Woods has stated that he was a member of the Democratic Party until the impeachment of Bill Clinton in 1999, commenting that "every single Democrat without exception stood behind a convicted perjurer. That was the end." Woods was a registered Independent during the presidencies of George W. Bush and Barack Obama; he has since aligned himself with the Republican Party. When Carly Fiorina pulled out of the 2016 presidential race, he shifted his endorsement to Ted Cruz in November 2015.

Woods has defended former U.S. President Donald Trump in the media, and has been described as a "staunch Trump supporter".

Woods' name was in an advertisement in the Los Angeles Times (August 17, 2006) that condemned Hamas and Hezbollah and supported Israel in the 2006 Lebanon War.

On July 4, 2018, The Gersh Agency, Woods' long-time talent agency, notified him by email that they would no longer represent him. Woods stated that the agency dropped him due to his political views. He has said that there were many conservative actors who did not share their thoughts because "the blacklist against conservatives in Hollywood is very real."

Twitter account
Woods has frequently expressed his conservative political views on Twitter and has been locked out of his account multiple times for violations of the platform's terms of service. In 2017, a Twitter debate between Woods and Amber Tamblyn escalated after Tamblyn accused Woods of once preying on her when she was underage, which Woods dismissed as a lie.

In 2018, Woods turned his Twitter feed into a bulletin board for missing California wildfire evacuees, and was credited with saving lives and helping to reunite missing loved ones and pets with their families. He provided aid to actresses Holly Marie Combs and Alyssa Milano, with the latter thanking him for his help saving her horses.

In an October 2018 tweet, he described billionaire George Soros as "satanic" and repeated an allegation that a teenaged Soros survived the Holocaust in Hungary by passing as Gentile and being a "Nazi collaborator". The basis of this allegation was Soros's account of serving on the Judenrat ("Jewish Council") at age 13, where he accompanied a Hungarian government official as he delivered deportation notices and confiscated Jewish property in Nazi-occupied Budapest.  

In February 2020, after an absence of nearly 10 months, Woods returned to Twitter. His Twitter account was briefly locked once more in March 2020 after he shared a photograph, described as "intimate media", of Democratic politician Andrew Gillum without his consent.

In 2022, analysis conducted by researchers with the University of Washington’s Center for an Informed Public and the Krebs Stamos Group found Woods was the top purveyor of election misinformation on Twitter during the late months of 2020.

In December 2022, Woods announced his intentions to sue the Democratic National Committee following Elon Musk's release of the Twitter Files. Journalist Matt Taibbi reported that the Democratic National Committee requested a tweet made by Woods, related to Hunter Biden, be removed from Twitter.

9/11 experience 
On August 1, 2001, Woods was on a flight from Boston to Los Angeles. On the flight he noticed four men near him acting suspiciously. He said that they never drank anything, ordered food service or talked to anybody, just whispering to each other. Woods reported his suspicions to the co-pilot in flight, and he claimed that those concerns were passed on to the FAA. On the evening of September 11, Woods called the FBI and repeated his concerns; they interviewed him at his home the next morning. Woods believed that he had encountered four of the nineteen terrorists/hijackers, who were just on the flight to study it in preparation for the attacks. Woods claims he has been interviewed several times by FBI agents regarding this incident. He has confirmed that he looked at pictures of the hijackers and has identified two terrorists as being among the men that he had seen on his flight.

References

External links

 
 
 
 
 James Woods Biography

1947 births
Living people
20th-century American male actors
21st-century American male actors
American conspiracy theorists
American critics of Islam
American male film actors
American male television actors
American male video game actors
American male voice actors
American people of British descent
American people of Irish descent
American poker players
Best Miniseries or Television Movie Actor Golden Globe winners
Catholics from Rhode Island
Catholics from Utah
Daytime Emmy Award winners
Independent Spirit Award for Best Male Lead winners
Male actors from Rhode Island
Male actors from Utah
MIT School of Humanities, Arts, and Social Sciences alumni
Outstanding Performance by a Lead Actor in a Miniseries or Movie Primetime Emmy Award winners
People from Vernal, Utah
People from Warwick, Rhode Island
Rhode Island Republicans
Sons of the American Revolution
Theatre World Award winners
Utah Republicans